Yazd Louleh Football Club is an Iranian football club based in Yazd, Iran.

History
In June 2012, Sang Ahan Bafgh company bought the license of Tarbiat Yazd football club in order to participate in 2012–13 Azadegan League. The team was moved back to Yazd in 2013 after it was originally moved from Yazd in 2012.
In October 2014, the club sold its license to Tarbiat Novin, and was dissolved due financial circumstances.

Name history
Sang Ahan Bafgh (2012–2013)
Yazd Louleh (2013–2014)

Players
As of November 23, 2012

First-team squad

Season-by-Season
The table below shows the achievements of the club in various competitions.

See also
 Hazfi Cup

References

External links
  Official club website
  Players and Results

Football clubs in Iran
Association football clubs established in 2013
Sport in Yazd Province
2012 establishments in Iran